Atkinson Municipal Airport  is three miles northwest of Pittsburg, in Crawford County, Kansas, United States. The National Plan of Integrated Airport Systems for 2011–2015 categorized it as a general aviation facility.

History
It was established as Pittsburg Airport in April 1940. It was taken over by the United States Army Air Force on May 25, 1942, as a basic (level 1) pilot training airfield. It was assigned to USAAF Gulf Coast Training Center (later Central Flying Training Command). The airport conducted contract basic flying training by McFarland Flying Service. Fairchild PT-19s were the primary trainers used. It also had several PT-17 Stearmans and a few P-40 Warhawks assigned. The flight school also operated two auxiliary airfields in the local area. Unpowered glider pilot training was performed by 21st Army Air Forces Glider Training Detachment from May 1942 until February 1943

The airport was inactivated on October 20, 1944, with the drawdown of AAFTC's pilot training program, and it was declared surplus in 1946. Responsibility for it was given to the War Assets Administration and was eventually acquired by the City of Pittsburg.

The airport saw airline flights from 1954 to 1960: Ozark Airlines Douglas DC-3s flew between Wichita, KS and St. Louis via Pittsburg, Joplin, and Springfield, MO.

Facilities
The airport covers 742 acres (300 ha) at an elevation of 946 feet (290 m).

In the year ending June 23, 2009, the airport had 23,600 aircraft operations, average 64 per day: 99.6% general aviation and 0.4% military.38 aircraft were then based at this airport: 66% single-engine, 18% jet, 8% multi-engine, 5% ultralight, and 3% helicopter.

See also

 Kansas World War II Army Airfields
 31st Flying Training Wing (World War II)

References

 Manning, Thomas A. (2005), History of Air Education and Training Command, 1942–2002.  Office of History and Research, Headquarters, AETC, Randolph AFB, Texas 
 Shaw, Frederick J. (2004), Locating Air Force Base Sites, History’s Legacy, Air Force History and Museums Program, United States Air Force, Washington DC.

External links

 Aerial photo as of September 1991 from USGS The National Map
 
 

USAAF Contract Flying School Airfields
Airfields of the United States Army Air Forces in Kansas
Airports in Kansas
Buildings and structures in Crawford County, Kansas
USAAF Central Flying Training Command
American Theater of World War II
Airports established in 1940
1940 establishments in Kansas